Daphne gnidium (commonly known as the flax-leaved daphne) is a poisonous evergreen shrub from the Mediterranean region with narrow, dense dark-green foliage and white fragrant flowers.

Description

The dense lanceolate leaves are dark green with sticky undersides. It bears white fragrant flowers in late spring or early summer. They are produced during autumn.

Habitat
Daphne gnidium grows well in sandy loam. They are commonly found in fields, woodlands, garrigues, and hillsides. They are native to the areas surrounding the Mediterranean Sea (Southern Europe, Northern Africa, and the Middle East).

Toxicity
Daphne gnidium contains the toxins mezerein and daphnetoxin. All parts of the plant are considered highly poisonous. Skin contact with the sap can cause dermatitis

Chance of death is small yet possible within 6 hours after direct consumption. At least severe anabolic and indigestive reactions are expected (which may also trigger lethal allergic reactions).

References 

gnidium
Plants described in 1753
Taxa named by Carl Linnaeus